Kaja Kajzer (born 31 January 2000) is a Slovenian judoka. She won the silver medal in the women's 57 kg event at the 2021 European Judo Championships held in Lisbon, Portugal.

She made her Olympic debut in 2021, when she competed in the women's 57 kg event at the 2020 Summer Olympic Games in Tokyo, Japan and finished on 5th place.

Achievements

References

External links
 

Living people
2000 births
Sportspeople from Ljubljana
Slovenian female judoka
Judoka at the 2019 European Games
European Games competitors for Slovenia
Judoka at the 2020 Summer Olympics
Olympic judoka of Slovenia
21st-century Slovenian women